Frances Mary Morris  (born January 1959) is the director of Tate Modern art gallery in London. She succeeded Chris Dercon in January 2016.

Education
Frances Morris was born in London. She attended a state school, Haberdashers' Aske's School for Girls, at the time a direct grant grammar, in New Cross, London. At University she studied history of art, receiving a bachelor's degree from the University of Cambridge and a master's degree from the Courtauld Institute of Art. Her master's thesis deals with French painter Jean Hélion.

Career
After working at the Arnolfini Gallery in Bristol, she joined the Tate Gallery as a curator in the Modern Collection in 1987, became Head of Displays at Tate Modern when it opened in 2000, and Director of Collections (International Art) in 2006.  In January 2016, she was appointed director of the Tate Modern. As Director, Morris oversees one of the world's most popular art museums, with an attendance of over 5.8 million visitors annually; she is also credited with elevating Tate Modern’s profile globally. She is the gallery's first British and first woman director.

Morris, along with her colleague Iwona Blazwick, was responsible with the initial presentation in 2000 of the Tate Modern's opening collection displays, organised thematically and in a non-chronological manner with mixing of contemporary artworks with those of Monet, Matisse, and Picasso. While the non-chronological style was controversial with art critics, it is now regularly used world-wide by museums and galleries; Tate Modern continues to display its collection in this way.

In her career, Morris has particularly focused on the work of women artists, and worked to extend the canon of art history to include work from outside Europe; since 2006 she has spearheaded Tate's global acquisitions strategy.  She has curated several large-scale international collaborative exhibitions including, most recently, major retrospectives for Louise Bourgeois in 2007, Yayoi Kusama in 2012, Agnes Martin in 2015, and Alberto Giacometti in 2017.

Morris is a board member of Fruitmarket Gallery, Edinburgh and the Conseil International des Musees d'Art Moderne (CIMAM) and a member of the Advisory Board of the Mori Art Museum, Tokyo]. In March 2018 she was appointed Distinguished Professor of Shanghai Academy of Fine Arts.  Morris is an Honorary Fellow of King's College, Cambridge, and holds Honorary Doctorates from the Universities of Essex, Edinburgh and York, from the Royal College of Art London and UAL.  She has published widely, and lectures and broadcasts to a broad variety of audiences across the UK and around the world.

Morris was appointed Commander of the Order of the British Empire (CBE) in the 2023 New Year Honours for services to the arts.

Personal life
Morris is married to Martin Caiger-Smith, Head of the MA Curating the Art Museum programme at the Courtauld Institute of Art. They have three children.

References

1959 births
Living people
British curators
Alumni of the University of Cambridge
Alumni of the Courtauld Institute of Art
Directors of museums in the United Kingdom
Tate Modern Directors
Women museum directors
Commanders of the Order of the British Empire